PictureBook Games: Pop-Up Pursuit (Asoberu Ehon Tobida Sugoroku! in Japan) is a party video game developed by Japanese studio Grounding Inc. and published by Nintendo for the Wii's WiiWare download service. It was released on March 26, 2009 in Japan for 1000 Nintendo Points, on August 17, 2009 in North America for 800 points and in the PAL regions on October 23, 2009, also for 800 points.

The game takes the form of a board game set inside a pop-up picture book. The game supports up to four players with optional computer-controlled players taking the place of spots not filled by human players.

References

2009 video games
WiiWare games
Wii-only games
Party video games
Wii games
Video games developed in Japan